Polledri is an Italian surname. Notable people with the surname include:

Angelo Polledri (1904–1997), Italian rower
Claudio Polledri (born 1936), Swiss fencer
Jake Polledri (born 1995), English-born Italian rugby union footballer

Italian-language surnames